Latrodectus rhodesiensis is a species of spider in the family Theridiidae, found in southern Africa. It is one of six species of Latrodectus found in southern Africa, two of which, including L. rhodesiensis, are known as brown button or brown widow spiders. Like all Latrodectus species, L. rhodesiensis has a neurotoxic venom. It acts on nerve endings, causing the very unpleasant symptoms of latrodectism when humans are bitten, although brown button spiders are not generally as venomous as black button or black widow spiders, such as L. indistinctus.

References

rhodesiensis
Spiders of Africa
Spiders described in 1972